National Highway 361C, commonly referred to as NH 361C, is a national highway in  India. It is a spur road of National Highway 61. NH-361C traverses the state of Maharashtra in India.

Route 

Digras, Donad, Darwha, Karanja, Mozor, Murtizapur.

Junctions  
 
  Terminal near Digras.
  Terminal near Murtizapur.

See also 

 List of National Highways in India
 List of National Highways in India by state

References

External links 

 NH 361C on OpenStreetMap

National highways in India
National Highways in Maharashtra